Salvia subpalmatinervis is a perennial plant that is native to Yunnan province in China, found growing in thickets, forests, and hilly grasslands at  elevation.

Notes

subpalmatinervis
Flora of China